The World Hydrogen Council is a global CEO-led initiative of 132 leading energy, transport, industry and investment companies with a united and long-term vision to develop the hydrogen economy. The key ambitions of the Hydrogen Council are to 1) accelerate significant investment in the development and commercialization of the hydrogen and fuel cell sectors and 2) encourage key stakeholders to increase their backing of hydrogen as part of the future energy mix.

Formation

The Hydrogen Council launched at the World Economic Forum in Davos on January 7, 2017. In one of two formal statements made at the Forum, Air Liquide Chairman and CEO Benoît Potier stated that the aim of the initiative is “to explain why hydrogen emerges among the key solutions for the energy transition, in mobility as well as in the power, industrial and residential sectors”.

The 13 inaugural members included Air Liquide, Alstom, Anglo American plc, BMW, Daimler AG, ENGIE, Honda, Hyundai Motor Company, Kawasaki Heavy Industries, Royal Dutch Shell, The Linde Group, Total S.A., and Toyota Motor Corporation.

Members

, the Hydrogen Council consists of 132 members separated into three groups: the Steering Group, the Supporting Group and the Investor Group.

Steering Group (52 members)

Abu Dhabi National Oil Company
The Anschutz Corporation
Airbus
Air Liquide
Air Products
Alstom
Anglo American
Audi AG
BMW GROUP
BP
Bosch
CF Industries
Chemours
China Energy
CMA CGM
CNH Industrial (via IVECO)
Cummins
Daimler
EDF
ENEOS Corporation
ENGIE
Equinor
Faurecia
General Motors
Great Wall Motor
Honda
Honeywell
Hyundai Motor
Iwatani
Johnson Matthey
Kawasaki
KOGAS
Linde
Michelin
Microsoft
MSC Group
OCI NV
Plastic Omnium
Saudi Aramco (via the Aramco Overseas Company)
Schaeffler Group
Shell
SABIC
Sasol
Solvay
Siemens Energy
Sinopec
thyssenkrupp
Total Energies
Toyota
Uniper
Weichai
Wood

Supporting Group (68 members)

3M
ACME
AFC Energy
AVL
Baker Hughes
Ballard Power Systems
Black & Veatch
Bureau Veritas
cellcentric
Chart Industries
Chevron
Clariant
Cryogenmash
Delek US Holdings
Eberspächer
ElringKlinger
Enbridge Gas
Faber Cylinders
First Element Fuel (True Zero)
Fortescue Metals Group
Fuel Cell Energy
Galp
W. L. Gore
Haldor Topsoe
Hexagon Composites
Howden
ILJIN Hysolus
Indian Oil Corporation
ITOCHU Corporation
John Cockerill
Komatsu
Liebherr
MAHLE
MAN Energy Solutions
MANN+HUMMEL
Marubeni
Matrix Service Company
McDermott
McPhy
Mitsubishi Corporation
Mitsubishi Heavy Industries Ltd.
Mitsui & Co
Nel Hydrogen
NGK Spark Plug Co.
Nikola Motor
NYK Line
Parker Hannifin Corporation
PETRONAS
Plug Power
Port of Rotterdam
Power Assets Holdings
Re-Fire Technology
Reliance Industries Limited
Sinocat
SinoHytec
Sinoma Science & Technology
Snam
Southern California Gas
Southern Company
Subsea 7
Sumitomo Corporation
Technip Energies
Tokyo Gas
Toyota Tsusho
TÜV SÜD
Umicore
Westport Fuel System
Woodside Energy

Investor Group (12 members)

Antin Infrastructure Partners
Barclays
BNP Paribas
Crédit Agricole
FiveT Hydrogen
GIC
Mubadala Investment Company
Natixis
Providence Asset Group
Société Générale
Sumitomo Mitsui Financial Group (SMFG)
Temasek

Governance
The Hydrogen Council is steered by a core group of executives who meet annually at a CEO level event. 
 
Ongoing governance is led by two Co-Chairs from different geographies and sectors, elected every two years by the council's Steering Members. Each year one of the two co-chair mandates are renewed for continuity.
The organisation is steered by two co-secretaries (representatives of the two Co-Chairs).

Co-Chairs and Co-Secretaries
To date the co-chair and Co-Secretary positions have been held by Air Liquide and Toyota (2017), Air Liquide, Hyundai (2018) and, Air Liquide and Hyundai (2019).

Partners 
As of November 2019, The Hydrogen Council lists its partners as The Center for Hydrogen Safety (CHS), The Clean Energy Ministerial (CEM), Energy Observer,  View, IEA Hydrogen, Mission Innovation (MI) and The World Economic Forum.

Reports
The Hydrogen Council has published three reports, in collaboration with McKinsey & Company, that are available on their website.

In August 2021, Reuters reported that the Hydrogen Council said it would only make commercial sense to use ammonia as a fuel source by 2030.

How Hydrogen Empowers the Energy Transition
Published in January 2017," How Hydrogen Empowers the Energy Transition" explores the seven roles of hydrogen in decarbonising major sectors of the economy and considers the policy environment needed to facilitate deployment of hydrogen technology.

Hydrogen Scaling Up: A Sustainable Pathway for the Global Energy Transition
Published in November 2017, "Hydrogen, scaling up" outlines a comprehensive and qualified roadmap for wide-scale deployment of hydrogen for decarbonisation of transport, industry and buildings, and enabling a renewable energy production and distribution system.

The scenarios outlined in the report suggest that hydrogen technologies could contribute to meeting 18% of the world's final energy demands, avoiding 6 Gt of  emissions, and creating a market with revenues of $2.5 trillion each year while providing 30 million jobs by mid-century. An investment of $280 billion – or annual investments of $20–25 billion until 2030 – would be required to build the hydrogen economy with these benefits.

Following publication of this report, the EU, France, and South Korea published similar analyses, focusing on their specific regions.

Hydrogen Meets Digital
Published in September 2018, "Hydrogen Meets Digital" investigates the impact of digitisation on energy demand, to establish a dialogue with the ICT sector on how digitisation and hydrogen could complement each other during the energy transition. The report concludes that hydrogen has strong benefits that could enable major digital trends and thus serve as an efficient, zero-emission energy vector.

Path to Hydrogen Competitiveness: A Cost Perspective 
Published in January 2020, "Path to Hydrogen Competitiveness: A Cost Perspective" provides an evidence base on the path to cost competitiveness for 40 hydrogen technologies used in 35 applications. The report suggests that scale-up will be the biggest driver of cost reduction, with cost projected to decrease by up to 50% by 2030 for a wide range of applications.

Events

CEO Events

The Hydrogen Council holds an annual CEO Event, where CEOs and C-suite representatives of member organisations meet to reflect on work of the previous year and to brainstorm strategies to accelerate the council's mission going forward. To date, five CEO Events have taken place. The first was held at the World Economic Forum in Davos (2017), the second at the COP 23 in Bonn, Germany (2017), the third in San Francisco, USA (2018)., the fourth in Versailles in January 2020 and the last one in a digital format in January 2021.

Side Events

The Hydrogen Council also hosts a number of side-events that gather CEOs and executives from member organisations, alongside key stakeholders and influencers in the energy conversation. Example of such events include: New York: Investor Day, Celebrating Hydrogen in the Clean Energy Economy, China: Hydrogen Industry Development Innovation Forum, and Korea: International Hydrogen Energy Forum., Japan : Karuizawa Investor Event in coordination with the G20 Energy Forum in June 2019.

Notes

References

External links 
 Hydrogen Council

Sustainable energy
Energy in Belgium
Hydrogen